Thomas Talks (15 May 1897 – 1987) was an English professional footballer who played as a forward.

References

1897 births
1987 deaths
People from Lincoln, England
English footballers
Association football forwards
Lincoln City F.C. players
Grimsby Rovers F.C. players
Grimsby Town F.C. players
Boston Town F.C. players
English Football League players